is a city located in Sorachi Subprefecture, Hokkaido, Japan.

As of September 2016, the city has an estimated population of 17,589 and a population density of 220 people per km2. The total area is 78.69 km2.

Name 
Name of Sunagawa is derived from an Ainu word "Ota-ushi-nai", meaning the river near sandy shore.

History 
1890 - Nae Village founded.
1895 - Nae Village Office opened.
1897 - Utashinai Village splits off .
1902 - Nae becomes a Second Class Municipality.
1903 - Nae Village becomes Sunagawa Village.
1907 - Sunagawa becomes a First Class Municipality.
1923 - Sunagawa Village becomes Sunagawa Town.
1944 - Naie Village splits off. 
1949 - Kamisunagawa Town splits off.
July 1, 1958 - Sunagawa Town becomes Sunagawa City.

Education

High school
 Hokkaido Sunagawa High School.

Transportation
 Hakodate Main Line : Toyonuma - Sunagawa
 Hokkaidō Expressway : Naie-Sunagawa IC (Naie) - Sunanaga SA - Takikawa IC (Takikawa)

Notable people from Sunagawa, Hokkaido
 Junichi Watanabe (1933–2014), Japanese writer and doctor 
 Mitsuya Nagai (born 1968), Japanese mixed martial artist, kickboxer and professional wrestler (Real Name: Hirokazu Nagai, Nihongo: 長井 弘和, Nagai Hirokazu)

External links

Official Website 

Cities in Hokkaido